Oh Baby, O Baby, Ooh Baby, Ooh Baby Baby, or Ooh Ooh Baby may refer to:

Film and television 
Oh! Baby (2019 film), an 2019 Indian fantasy comedy film
Oh, Baby! (1926 film), a 1926 American silent comedy film
Oh, Baby! (2020 film), a 2020 American short film by Kate Morgan Chadwick
Oh Baby (TV series), an American comedy series that aired on Lifetime (1998–2000)
"Ooh Baby Baby", an episode from the American TV series Bear in the Big Blue House

Music

Albums
Oh Baby! (Big John Patton album), 1965
Oh, Baby! (Bill Cosby album), 1991 
Oh Baby, a 1996 album by Rick Fay
Oh Baby, a 2002 album by Mike Melvoin

Songs

O Baby
"O Baby", a 1995 single by Siouxsie and the Banshees
"O Baby", a song by Robyn on the 2003 album Don't Stop the Music
"O Baby (I Do Believe I'm Losing You)", a 1968 single by Billy Hawks
"O Baby", a track on the soundtrack for the 2016 film Ricky

Oh Baby
"Oh Baby" (Walter Donaldson song), 1923, recorded by The Wolverine Orchestra and others
"Oh, Baby!", a 1928 song by Owen Murphy
"Oh Baby", a 1956 song by Cathy Carr
"Oh Baby", a 1958 song by Esquerita
"Oh Baby", a 1958 song by The Jesters
"Oh Baby", a 1960 song by Larry Williams
"Oh Baby" (Little Walter song), 1954, covered by Led Zeppelin and Kim Wilson
"Oh Baby", a 1984 song by Münchener Freiheit (band)
"Oh Baby", a song by LCD Soundsystem from the 2017 album American Dream
"Oh Baby", a song by Cinta Laura from the 2010 album Cinta Laura
"Oh Baby", a song by Status Quo from the 1973 album Piledriver
"Oh Baby", a song by Suzi Quatro from the 1982 album Main Attraction
"Oh Baby", a 2010 song by Robbie Rivera with Dero and Juan Magán
"Oh Baby", a 2002 single by Yorkshire singer Rhianna
"Oh Baby" (Twenty 4 Seven song), 1994
"Oh Baby", a song by Korean group Sistar from the 2011 album So Cool
"Oh Baby", a 2023 song by Nathan Dawe and Bru-C featuring Bshp and Issey Cross

Ooh Baby
"Ooh Baby", a song by R&B singer Ciara from the 2004 album Goodies
"Ooh Baby" (Mario song), 2010
"Ooh Baby (You Know That I Love You)," a 1975 song by George Harrison
"Ooh Baby", a 1966 song by Bo Diddley, included in the 1997 collection His Best
"Ooh Baby", a 1962 song by Chuck Jackson
"Ooh Baby", a 1967 song by Deon Jackson, Harold Thomas, Richard Barbary
"Ooh Baby", a 1975 song by Gary Lewis & the Playboys
"Ooh Baby", a 1973 song by Gilbert O'Sullivan, covered by Frank Schöbel
"Ooh Baby", a 1965 song by Howlin' Wolf

Ooh Baby Baby
"Ooo Baby Baby", a 1965 single by The Miracles written Pete Moore and Smokey Robinson, and covered as "Ooh Baby Baby" by Linda Ronstadt and others
"Ooh Baby Baby", a song by Lil Rob on the 2005 album Twelve Eighteen, Pt. 1

Ooh Ooh Baby
"Ooh, Ooh Baby" (Taral Hicks song), a 1996 single by R&B singer Taral Hicks featuring Missy Elliott
"Ooh Ooh Baby", a song by Britney Spears from the 2007 album Blackout

Other uses
Oh Baby, a brand line of Destination Maternity

See also
"Baby-Baby-Baby", a single by TLC from the 1992 album Ooooooohhh... On the TLC Tip
"Oh Baby Don't You Weep", a 1964 song by James Brown
"Oh Baby I...", a 1994 single by British band Eternal